The UK Singles Chart is one of many music charts compiled by the Official Charts Company that calculates the best-selling singles of the week in the United Kingdom. Since 2004 the chart has been based on the sales of both physical singles and digital downloads, with airplay figures excluded from the official chart. This list shows singles that peaked in the Top 10 of the UK Singles Chart during 2010, as well as singles which peaked in 2009 and 2011 but were in the top 10 in 2010. The entry date is when the song appeared in the top 10 for the first time (week ending, as published by the Official Charts Company, which is six days after the chart is announced).

One-hundred and fifty-two singles were in the top ten in 2010. Nine singles from 2009 remained in the top 10 for several weeks at the beginning of the year, while "What's My Name?" by Rihanna featuring Drake" and "Who's That Chick?" by David Guetta featuring Rihanna were both released in 2010 but did not reach their peak until 2011.. "TiK ToK" by Kesha, "Starstrukk" by 3OH!3 featuring Katy Perry, "Don't Stop Believing" by Journey, "Look for Me" by Chipmunk featuring Talay Riley, "The Climb" by Joe McElderry and "3 Words" by Cheryl Cole featuring will.i.am were the singles from 2009 to reach their peak in 2010. Forty-six artists scored multiple entries in the top 10 in 2010. Ellie Goulding, Justin Bieber, Nicki Minaj, Tinie Tempah and The Wanted were among the many artists who achieved their first UK charting top 10 single in 2010.

The first number-one single of the year was "The Climb" by X Factor series 6 winner Joe McElderry. Overall, thirty-five different singles peaked at number-one in 2010, with JLS (3, including the charity single "Everybody Hurts" with Helping Haiti) having the most singles hit that position.

Background

Multiple entries
One-hundred and fifty-two singles charted in the top 10 in 2010, with one-hundred and forty-five singles reaching their peak this year.

Forty-six artists scored multiple entries in the top 10 in 2010. Rihanna secured the record for most top 10 hits in 2010 with six hit singles.

Chart debuts
Seventy artists achieved their first top 10 single in 2010, either as a lead or featured artist. Of these, fifteen went on to record another hit single that year: B.o.B, Drake, Ellie Goulding, Emma's Imagination, Example, Florence and the Machine, Iyaz, Justin Bieber, Labrinth, Matt Cardle, Nicki Minaj, Professor Green, Roll Deep, Swedish House Mafia and The Wanted. Bruno Mars and Glee Cast scored two more top 10 singles in 2010. Tinie Tempah had three other entries in his breakthrough year.

The following table (collapsed on desktop site) does not include acts who had previously charted as part of a group and secured their first top 10 solo single.

Notes
Although Jedward scored their first top 10 hit in 2010 with "Under Pressure (Ice Ice Baby)" they were part of The X Factor series 6 finalists, who reached number-one with "You Are Not Alone". Olly Murs, who also featured on this single, had his first two top 10 entries in his own right, namely debut "Please Don't Let Me Go" and "Thinking of Me". Diana Vickers peaked at number one with "Once" in 2010 but had appeared on The X Factor in 2008 and, along with her fellow contestants, landed the top spot that same year with their cover of Mariah Carey's "Hero".

McLean had his first solo hit single, "Your Name", this year but he had a previous chart credit on "I Got Soul" with Young Soul Rebels. Matt Cardle sang on "Heroes" with his fellow X Factor series seven contestants prior to his debut solo hit "When We Collide". Cher Lloyd, One Direction and Olly Murs would both go on to record top 10 singles in later years.

Travie McCoy of Gym Class Heroes had his first independent top 10 hit, collaborating with B.o.B. on "Billionaire". Brandon Flowers had multiple top 10 singles as part of The Killers and achieved the first under his own name in 2010 with "Crossfire", reaching a number 8 peak.

Songs from films
Original songs from various films entered the top 10 throughout the year. These included "We Dance On" (from StreetDance 3D) and "Club Can't Handle Me" (Step Up 3D).

Charity singles
A number of singles recorded for charity reached the top ten in the charts in 2010. These included "Everybody Hurts" by Helping Haiti and "Heroes"

Best-selling singles
Eminem featuring Rihanna had the best-selling single of the year with "Love the Way You Lie". The song spent fourteen weeks in the top 10 (peaking at number two), sold over 854,000 copies and was certified platinum by the BPI. "When We Collide" by Matt Cardle came in second place, selling more than 814,000 copies and losing out by around 40,000 sales. Bruno Mars's "Just the Way You Are, "Only Girl in the World" from Rihanna and "OMG" by Usher featuring will.i.am made up the top five. Singles by Owl City, B.o.B featuring Hayley Williams, Katy Perry featuring Snoop Dogg, Yolanda Be Cool & DCUP and Tinie Tempah were also in the top ten best-selling singles of the year.

Top-ten singles
Key

Entries by artist

The following table shows artists who achieved two or more top 10 entries in 2010, including singles that reached their peak in 2009 or 2011. The figures include both main artists and featured artists, while appearances on ensemble charity records are also counted for each artist. The total number of weeks an artist spent in the top ten in 2010 is also shown.

Notes

  "One Shot" re-entered the top 10 at number 10 on 6 March 2010 (week ending) following the physical release.
  Released as a "Charity Single" towards the 2010 Haiti earthquake.
  Released as a single towards The BRIT Trust.
  "Gave It All Away" re-entered the top 10 at number 10 on 3 April 2010 (week ending).
  "OMG" re-entered the top 10 at number 6 on 19 June 2010 (week ending) following a performance on Britain's Got Talent.
  "The Best" originally peaked at number 5 in 1989, but re-entered the top 10 following a campaign by Rangers F.C. fans.
  "Three Lions" originally peaked at number 1 in 1996, but re-entered the top 10 due to the World Cup.
  "DJ Got Us Falling in Love" re-entered the top 10 at number 10 on 23 October 2010 (week ending) following a performance on The X Factor.
  "Make You Feel My Love" re-entered the top 10 at number 9 on 19 November 2010 (week ending) following a performance from Rebecca Ferguson on The X Factor. The single re-entered for a second time on 4 December 2010 following the use of the song on The X Factor. It re-entered the top 10 for a third time at number 7 on 16 January 2011 following usage on Dancing on Ice.
  "The Time (Dirty Bit)" re-entered the top 10 at number 6 on 11 December 2010 (week ending) following the release of the album The Beginning.
  "The Flood" re-entered the top 10 at number 6 on 25 December 2010 (week ending) following a performance on The X Factor Final.
  "Firework" re-entered the Top 10 at number 8 and "Like a G6" re-entered at number 10; both on 1 January 2011 (week ending).
 Figure includes appearances on Eminem's "Love the Way You Lie" and David Guetta's "Who's That Chick?".
 Figure includes appearances on 3OH!3's "Starstrukk" and Timbaland's "If We Ever Meet Again".
 Figure includes appearance on the Helping Haiti charity single "Everybody Hurts".
 Figure includes appearance on Swedish House Mafia's "Miami 2 Ibiza".
 Figure includes appearances on B.o.B's "Nothin' on You" and Travie McCoy's "Billionaire".
 Figure includes appearance on the 2010 FIFA World Cup song "Shout".
 Figure includes appearances on Taio Cruz's "Dirty Picture" and 3OH!3's "My First Kiss".
 Figure includes appearances on Alexandra Burke's "All Night Long", Enrique Iglesias' " Like It" and Usher's "DJ Got Us Fallin' in Love".
 Figure includes appearance on McFly's "Shine a Light".
 Figure includes song that peaked in 2009.
 Figure includes song that peaked in 2011.
 Figure includes two singles with the group The Black Eyed Peas.
 Figure includes appearance on Cheryl Cole's "3 Words".
 Figure includes appearance on Florence and the Machine's "You Got the Dirtee Love".
 Figure includes appearances on Flo Rida's "Club Can't Handle Me" and Kelly Rowland's "Commander".
 Figure includes a single with the group Take That.
 Released as the official single for Children in Need.
 Figure includes song that first charted in 2009 but peaked in 2010.
 "Look for Me" re-entered the top 10 at number 10 on 9 January 2010 (week ending), rising to number 7 the following week.
 Figure includes one top 10 single with the group Young Money.
 Figure includes appearance on "Heroes" as part of The X Factor UK 2010 finalists.
 Figure includes appearance on Jay Sean's "2012 (It Ain't the End)".
 Figure includes appearance on Rihanna's "What's My Name?".
 Figure includes appearance on The Saturday's "Higher".
 Figure includes appearance on Tinie Tempah's "Frisky".7
 Figure includes appearance on Enrique Iglesias' "Heartbeat".
  "What's My Name?" reached its peak of number one on 15 January 2011 (week ending).

See also
 2010 in British music
 List of UK Singles Chart number ones of the 2010s

References
General

Specific

External links
2010 singles chart archive at the Official Charts Company (click on relevant week)

United Kingdom Top 10 Singles
Top 10 Singles
2010